Southwest Territory is a Wild West themed land at Six Flags Great America in Gurnee, Illinois. The roughly eleven-acre area opened in 1996 for the park's 20th anniversary, and was the largest expansion since its opening in 1976. Originally set to be built as "The Great Southwest" in 1979 under Marriott's operation, the area never came to fruition and the area was stalled.

When Southwest Territory was built, it was built in three phases. Set in an 1800s themed Wild West town, the area features six attractions, including the roller coasters Raging Bull and Viper, along with multiple flat rides such as Chubasco and Ricochet.

History

The Great Southwest concept (1977-1982)

During the initial planning of Marriott's Great America in Gurnee, a seventh themed land, The Great Southwest, was intended to be added the park as its first major expansion after opening. The land was planned to open in 1979, but the plans never materialized. Early signs of another land came in 1977, the park's second season, with the addition of the Southern Cross Skyride. Manufactured by the Swiss firm Von Roll, the Southern Cross was one of the tallest and longest gondola rides that the company ever produced for an amusement park, at 120 feet in the air. The reason for the height was that the Southern Cross intersected perpendicularly and also passed over the Delta Flyer/Eagle's Flight skyride. The Southern Cross was a round trip to the future plot of The Great Southwest, which was just a large pile of dirt. After the park missed its intended 1979 opening for the land, the Southern Cross operated for just three more seasons before being removed after the 1982 season.

Southwest Territory expansion phases (1995-1997)

Pre-phases: Viper (1995) 
After years of planning, Six Flags finally began to develop The Great Southwest in time for the park's 20th anniversary, now known as Southwest Territory. Although not announced, the park would open Southwest Territory in three annual phases from 1995 until 1997. The first of these phases was Viper, an all-new wooden roller coaster. It was the first roller coaster to be designed and installed directly by Six Flags. It was modeled after the Coney Island Cyclone, and constructed from 700,000 board-feet of southern pine. The ride's station is themed after Colonel Peabody's Snake Oil Elixir Pharmaceutical Factory, a facility which was abandoned and overrun with snakes, hence the ride's name. As Southwest Territory was still relatively a secret, Viper was listed as being part of Hometown Square.

Phase 1: Southwest Territory opening (1996) 
For the 1996 season, the second phase of the Southwest Territory expansion came in the form of an eleven-acre themed land that opened adjacent to Viper, and would be built in three different phases. The Old West Town featured 1800s-themed western-style retail stores and restaurants, as well as a saloon split across two sides of a single block. The front part of the area's signature Spanish Mission opened, with the back part with the Chubasco tea cups still under construction.

Phase 2: Giant Drop (1997) 

For the 1997 season, the Giant Drop debuted as the third and final phase of Southwest Territory. It is a 227-foot tall Intamin drop tower, themed after an "Ore excavator" owned by the Loco Diablo Mining Company. Construction on the attraction began in October 1996 and had completed construction in December 1996.

As part of the ride's opening ceremony, 200 couples from throughout the Midwest participated in a wedding ceremony on the ride. The couples were pronounced husband and wife just before they dropped, and the wedding ceremony was held in the Southwest Territory Amphitheater. The mass wedding ceremony took place in the Southwest Amphitheater. Also that year, the backside of the Spanish Mission was completed.

Phase 3: Raging Bull (1999) 
The last and final phase was built for the 1999 season. This attraction would be Raging Bull. It became the park's tallest roller coaster, which it remains to be today. The ride is themed after a ferocious beast that once terrorized the citizens of Southwest Territory, and it travels throughout the entire land. It was the world's first "hyper-twister" roller coaster, and is the most popular ride in the park.

Attractions

Roller coasters 
Southwest Territory features two roller coasters.

Flat rides 
In total, Southwest Territory features four attractions. Only one attraction has been removed, Trailblazer, in 2006.

Restaurants
Fiesta Fries Cantina
Waterin' Hole
The Oasis
Six Below
JB's Barbecue and Sports Bar

Former restaurants
Crazy Buffalo Saloon (1996-2010s)

Entertainment

Southwest Territory Amphitheater 
The Southwest Territory Amphitheater was a large, outdoor stunt arena that was built in 1993 for The Batman Stunt Show. With the debut of Southwest Territory in 1996, the theater received a renovation to fit in with the new land, and was renamed the Southwest Territory Amphitheater. That year, it featured the Warner Bros. Western Stunt Show, a crossover show that features characters from many different Western films and television shows, including Maverick, F Troop, and Blazing Saddles. In 2007, the theater's last major production came in the form of Operation SpyGirl, a stunt show created by Joel Surnow, co-creator of the TV series 24. In 2015, it was finally demolished to make way for Justice League: Battle for Metropolis and the new Metropolis Plaza area.

References

Six Flags Great America
Gurnee, Illinois
Themed areas in Six Flags amusement parks